Beaussant is a French surname. Notable people with the surname include:

Antoine Beaussant (born 1957), French entrepreneur, businessman, and oboeist 
Philippe Beaussant (1930–2016), French musicologist and novelist, father of Antoine

French-language surnames